Nord Department may refer to:
 Nord (French department)
 Nord (Haitian department)
 Nord Department (Ivory Coast), a defunct department of Ivory Coast

See also 
 Nord (disambiguation)

Department name disambiguation pages